Cussewago Creek is a  long tributary to French Creek that is classed as a 4th order stream on the EPA waters geoviewer site.

Variant names
According to the Geographic Names Information System, it has also been known historically as:  
Cassewago Creek
Kossewago Creek

The name of the creek is alleged to come from the aboriginal inhabitants, and is said to mean, "big belly".

Course
Cussewago Creek rises north of Eureka Springs in Erie County, Pennsylvania and flows south into Crawford County, Pennsylvania to meet French Creek at Meadville.

Watershed
Cussewago Creek drains  of Erie Drift Plain (glacial geology). The watershed receives an average of 45.4 in/year of precipitation and has a wetness index of 492.71.  The watershed is about 44% forested.

Natural History

Cussewago Creek supports a diverse fauna, including mammals, amphibians, fishes, and mollusks.

See also
 List of rivers of Pennsylvania
 List of tributaries of the Allegheny River

References

Rivers of Pennsylvania
Tributaries of the Allegheny River
Rivers of Crawford County, Pennsylvania